Johan Brunström and Jean-Julien Rojer were the defending champions. They chose to start in these championships and they were first seeds. However they lost to Ruben Bemelmans and Riccardo Ghedin in the quarter final. Karol Beck and Jaroslav Levinský defeated Colin Fleming and Ken Skupski 6–2, 6–7, [10–7] in the final.

It took place in Pozoblanco, Spain between 6 and 12 July 2009.

Seeds

Draw

Draw

References
 Doubles draw

Doubles
2009